Capoocan (IPA: [kɐpo'ʔɔkan]), officially the Municipality of Capoocan, is a 4th class municipality in the province of Leyte, Philippines. According to the 2020 census, it has a population of 33,721 people.

History

The name Capoocan comes from the dialect term mapu-uk which means obstructed or "obstaculizado" in Spanish. It lies along the shores of Carigara Bay - its people drawing sustenance both from the waters which give an abundant harvest of fish that find their way in the markets of Tacloban and Carigara, as well as in the fertile lands that end at the foot of Mount Minoro.

Expansion efforts have been limited by the presence of Mount Minoro. The mountain obstructs and contains the town in its present site - forbidding further growth but protecting the town from the strong typhoons that have battered neighboring towns.

In 1904, the town earned its independence from its mother municipality, Carigara. Apparently too young for such a difficult undertaking, Capoocan willingly returned to barrio status after a few years of determined but unsuccessful attempts at independence.

On January 1, 1928, when it finally gathered strength and gained experience, Capoocan was granted municipal status again. It was ranked as a fifth class municipality at first but later on ascended to fourth class category.

Its first town executive was Brigido Merelos. In 1931, Jose Pagar was elected president but his term was short since he was appointed municipal judge of Pastrana. It was Perfecto Pilapil who succeeded him to serve the un-expired term.

In 1935, Solos M. Hernandez was elected mayor. He was re-elected in 1939 but he died at the outbreak of World War II.

During World War II, after the official surrender of the American-Filipino forces, the Japanese troops, ranging from 2000 to 5000, landed on the town on May 25, 1942. A column proceeded to the east coast, capturing Tacloban and the other to the west to the port of Ormoc.

From 1867 when Capoocan was a "visita" of Carigara, the town has shown remarkable increase in population. After 38 years on its own as a town, Capoocan has grown into its present site - 17 barrios stretching to as far as 30 kilometers from the town proper and a "población" that shows promise.

Geography

Barangays
Capoocan is politically subdivided into 21 barangays.

Climate

Demographics

Education
There are a total of 20 Elementary Schools and 4 secondary Schools in Capoocan

Grade School/ Elementary School

Secondary/ High School
{{columns-list|colwidth=20em|
 Asuncion S. Melgar National High School (Zone II Poblacion, Capoocan, Leyte)
 Don Mariano Salvacion Memorial National High School ( Lemon, Capoocan, Leyte)
 Libertad National High School (Libertad, Capoocan, Leyte)
 Pinamopoan National High School (Pinamopoan, Capoocan, Leyte)

Notable personalities

Bishop Oscar Jaime Florencio - current auxiliary bishop of the Roman Catholic Archdiocese of Cebu and apostolic administrator of the Military Ordinariate of the Philippines

References

External links
 [ Philippine Standard Geographic Code]
Philippine Census Information
Local Governance Performance Management System

Municipalities of Leyte (province)